William Patrick Fitzgerald (12 March 1874 – 25 March 1903) was an Australian rules footballer who played with Collingwood in the Victorian Football League (VFL).

He died after falling from a horse in 1903.

Notes

External links 

Pat Fitzgerald's profile at Collingwood Forever

1874 births
1903 deaths
Australian rules footballers from Victoria (Australia)
Collingwood Football Club players